Ignazio Stern (or Ignaz Stern) (January 17, 1679 – May 28, 1748), born in Mauerkirchen in Austria, was a Baroque painter who worked in Rome, dying there in 1748.

Biography
He was a pupil of Carlo Cignani in Bologna, and worked in Lombardy, then in Rome. He painted an Annunciation for the church of the Nunziata in Piacenza. In Rome, he frescoed the sacristy of S. Paolino, and left some oil pictures in the church of S. Elisabetta. He was the father of the painters Ludovico Stern and Veronica Stern.

Works

Allegory of Spring, Los Angeles County Museum of Art 
Sts. Sergius and Bacchus and St. Basil, Church of Sts. Sergius and Bacchus, Rome

References

1679 births
1748 deaths
17th-century Austrian painters
Austrian male painters
18th-century Austrian painters
18th-century Austrian male artists
18th-century Italian painters
Italian male painters
18th-century Italian male artists